Michael Lira (born 19 February 1975) is an Australian film score composer and band leader. He is a founding member of experimental bands Vicious Hairy Mary, Darth Vegas and gypsy swing ensemble Monsieur Camembert. Soundtrack credits include the films Nekrotronic, The Hunter, Wyrmwood and the television series Rake and Bogan Pride.

Awards 

|-
| 2020
| Nekrotronic
| Best Music for a Feature Film
| APRA-AGSC Screen Music Awards
| 
| 
|-
| 2017
| Skinford
| Best Television Theme
| APRA-AGSC Screen Music Awards
| 
| 
|-
| 2017
| Iron Spyder
| Best Original Score
|St Kilda Film Festival
| 
| shared with Mick Harvey

|-
| 2015
| Growing Up Smith (AKA Good Ol'Boy)
| Best Music for a Feature Film
| APRA-AGSC Screen Music Awards
| 
| 
| 

|-
| 2014
| Rake – "Series 3 Episode 1"
| Best Music for a Television Series or Serial
| APRA-AGSC Screen Music Awards
| 
| with David McCormack & Antony Partos
| 

|-
| rowspan="3"| 2013
| Apart
| Tropscore
| Tropfest
| 
| 
|
|-
| A to Z of Contemporary Art
| Best Music for a Documentary
| rowspan="2"| APRA-AGSC Screen Music Awards
| 
|
| 

|-
| Rake – "Season 2 Episode 8: Greene"
|Best Music for a Television Series or Serial
| 
| with David McCormack & Antony Partos
| 

|-
| rowspan="2"|2012
| Wild Boys
|Best Music for a Television Series or Serial
| rowspan="2"|APRA-AGSC Screen Music Awards
| 
| with David McCormack 
| 

|-
| The Slap
|Best Soundtrack Album 
| 
| with Jono Ma & Antony Partos
| 

|-
| rowspan="3"|2011
| rowspan="2"|The Hunter
|Best Original Music Score  
| AFI / AACTA
| 
| with Matteo Zingales & Andrew Lancaster

|-
|Best Original Music Score  
| Film Critics Circle of Australia Awards 
| 
| with Matteo Zingales & Andrew Lancaster
|
|-
| Rake
|Best Music for a Television Series or Serial 
| APRA-AGSC Screen Music Awards
| 
| with David McCormack & Antony Partos
|

|-
| 2009
| Bogan Pride
|Best Music for a Television Series or Serial
| APRA-AGSC Screen Music Awards
| 
|
|

|-
| rowspan="2"| 2007
| Staines Down Drains
|Best Television Theme
| rowspan="2"| APRA-AGSC Screen Music Awards
| 
| 
| 

|-
| Staines Down Drains – "Episode 22: Pipe Dreams"
|Best Music for Children's Television
| 
|
| 

|-
| 2004
| The Einstein Factor
| Best Television Theme
| APRA-AGSC Screen Music Awards
| 
|
|

References

 http://themusic.com.au/news/all/2013/11/27/screen-composer-michael-lira-wins-tropscore/
 https://variety.com/2011/film/reviews/the-hunter-3-1117946037/
 http://www.apra-amcos.com.au/2013ScreenMusicAwards/documentary.html
 
 https://www.imdb.com/name/nm1883403/
 http://www.smh.com.au/news/cd--gig-reviews/darth-vegas/2005/10/28/1130400351435.html
 http://www.smh.com.au/entertainment/music/lifechanging-event-losing-an-arm-20131231-3046p.html
 http://www.theaureview.com/albums/darth-vegas-brainwashing-for-dirty-minds-2012-lp

1975 births
APRA Award winners
Australian bandleaders
Australian film score composers
Australian television composers
Living people
Male film score composers
Male television composers